John V. A. Fine Jr. (born 1939) is an American historian and author. He is professor of Balkan and Byzantine history at the University of Michigan and has written several books on the subject.

Early life and education
He was born in 1939 and grew up in Princeton, New Jersey. His father, John Van Antwerp Fine Sr. (1903–87), was Professor of Greek History in the Classics Department of Princeton University. His mother, Elizabeth Bunting Fine, was also a classicist and taught Latin and Greek at Miss Fine’s School.

Fine Jr.'s undergraduate and graduate training was at Harvard University, where he studied Byzantium, the Balkans, and medieval Russia. He earned his Ph.D. from Harvard in 1968 and began teaching at the University of Michigan in 1969.

Career and academic interests
Medievalist Paul Stephenson, lead professor at the School of History and Heritage, University of Lincoln, and a Fellow of the Royal Historical Society, expressed high regard for Fine's work and compared him with the likes of Paul M. Barford, Simon Franklin, Jonathan Shepard.

His academic interests range from theology and the history of Christianity to Byzantium and the medieval and modern Balkans. His publications have become standard in the field, notably his surveys of the Medieval Balkans (1983 and 1987). He has also revolutionized the way scholars understand the Bosnian Church (first published in 1975; republished in England in 2006), showing that it was not heretical.

In 2006, Fine published a study of notions of ethnicity in Croatia from the medieval period to the nineteenth century titled When Ethnicity Did Not Matter in the Balkans. In 2008, Emily Greble Balić, gave a positive review stating that "(o)ne of the book's great strengths is Fine's analysis of premodern "ethnic" identity". In 2009, John K. Cox of North Dakota State University reviewed it largely positively, noting some points of criticism. James P. Krokar review from 2009 was also positive, stating that the book is "extremely important" addition to "South Slavic history, and to the debate on the modernity of the nation." The same year, Neven Budak of the University of Zagreb gave a mixed review, noting both some positive and negative aspects. On the negative side, Budak complained alleging "ideological prejudices" and "preconceived conclusions". He claimed  that "the author did not prepare methodologically, nor did he become acquainted with the relevant works of non-Croatian authors", that Fine's approach to the topic "contrary to stated intentions - is traditionalist in its method, superficial and unreliable", alleging inappropriate "attitude towards Croats".

Studies on Bosnian history
Fine has also contributed to understanding of Bosnian history, working to correct popular misconceptions, especially during the Balkan wars of the 1990s. He co-authored Bosnia and Hercegovina: A Tradition Betrayed with former student Robert J. Donia (1994), a work published in England, the US, and in Bosnian translation in war-time Sarajevo (1995). He traveled to and lectured in the besieged cities of Sarajevo and Mostar during the war.

Works

See also
History of Bosnia and Herzegovina
Bosnian Church
History of the Balkans
Byzantine Empire

References

Further reading 
 John Fine reviews Bosnia by Noel Malcolm. London Review of Books (28 April 1994).

External links 

 V.A. Fine Jr., John's "Michigan University Department of History" page
 John Van Antwerp Fine Jr. at Open Library

Historians of the Balkans
Medievalists
American medievalists
University of Michigan faculty
Harvard University alumni
1939 births
Living people
Historians of Bosnia and Herzegovina